Punda (English:Naughty) is a 2010 Indian Kannada language action-drama film directed Sivashangkar Mohan. The film stars Yogesh and Meghana Raj, making her Kannada Debut, in prominent roles. The film is presented by R. B. Choudary's Super Good Films and the music was composed by G. V. Prakash Kumar. The film is about a man who loses his motorbike to the local goons and goes on a long struggle to get it back from them. The film is a remake of the Tamil film Polladhavan  starred Dhanush and  Divya Spandana the lead roles.

Cast 
 Yogesh as Yogi
 Meghana Raj as Megha
 Avinash
 Petrol Prasanna
 Sharath Lohitashwa as Bhoja
 Thulasi

Soundtrack 
All the songs are composed and scored by G. V. Prakash Kumar except wherever noted.

Reception 
A critic from The Times of India scored the film at 2.5 out of 5 stars and wrote "While Yogesh has done a good job, Sharath Lohithashwa, Avinash, Petrol Prasanna, Kaurava Venkatesh have justified their role. Music by Prashanth Kumar is average and Shekhar Prasanna's cinematography is okay". Shruti Indira Lakshminarayana of Rediff scored the film at 2.5 out of 5 stars and says "The film also does not have a peppy dance number that Yogish's films are usually known for. Pakkada mane huduganaa… falls short of the chartbuster status. Punda is a time pass watch for Yogish's fans who haven't seen Polladhavan". BSS from Deccan Herald wrote "Debutante Meghana adds the necessary oomph in a limited role. Prasanna is an able antagonist, sometimes outshining Yogesh. In the end, “Punda” will definitely endear himself to Yogesh fans". A critic from Bangalore Mirror wrote  "The credit for Punda being a good watch should go to the original makers. A good performance by Yogish and Meghana. The songs do not stand up to the standard of Yogish’s earlier films. Despite some blood sport, Punda is worth a watch".

References

External links

2010 films
2010s Kannada-language films
Indian romantic action films
Kannada remakes of Tamil films
Films scored by G. V. Prakash Kumar